The 1994–95 NBA season was the Pistons' 47th season in the National Basketball Association, and 38th season in the city of Detroit. After losing 62 games in 1993 along with the retirements of Bill Laimbeer and Isiah Thomas, the Pistons started a new era by drafting Grant Hill out of Duke University with the third overall pick in the 1994 NBA draft. The team also signed free agents Oliver Miller, Johnny Dawkins, and Rafael Addison, and acquired Mark West from the Phoenix Suns during the off-season. However, after a respectable 8–7 start to the season, the Pistons lost 13 of their next 14 games, which included an 8-game losing streak, as second-year guard Lindsey Hunter only played just 42 games due to foot and ankle injuries, and Dawkins was released to free agency after 50 games. After holding a 17–29 record at the All-Star break, the Pistons continued to struggle losing eight of their final nine games, finishing last place in the Central Division with a 28–54 record.

Hill became an immediate fan favorite averaging 19.9 points, 6.4 rebounds, 5.0 assists and 1.8 steals per game, was named to the NBA All-Rookie First Team, and went on to share the Rookie of the Year honors with Jason Kidd of the Dallas Mavericks, while Joe Dumars, the last of the original players from the Bad Boys era, averaged 18.1 points and 5.5 assists per game. Hill and Dumars were both selected for the 1995 NBA All-Star Game, which was Hill's first All-Star appearance, as he also became the first rookie ever to lead in All-Star voting.

In addition, Terry Mills provided the team with 15.5 points and 7.8 rebounds per game, while second-year guard Allan Houston showed improvement averaging 14.5 points per game, and Miller averaged 8.5 points, 7.4 rebounds and 1.8 blocks per game. Addison contributed 8.3 points per game off the bench, but was released by the team to free agency shortly before the season had ended, while Hunter contributed 7.5 points and 1.2 steals per game, and West provided with 7.5 points, 6.1 rebounds and 1.5 blocks per game.

Following the season, Miller left in the 1995 NBA Expansion Draft, and head coach Don Chaney was fired. 

For the season, the Pistons added new red alternate road uniforms with blue side panels, which remained in use until the franchise's 1996 Teal rebrand.

Draft picks

Roster

Roster Notes
Small forward Rafael Addison was waived on April 19.

Regular season

Season standings

z - clinched division title
y - clinched division title
x - clinched playoff spot

Record vs. opponents

Game log

Regular season

|- align="center" bgcolor="#ffcccc"
| 35
| January 20, 19958:00p.m. EST
| Houston
| L 96–106
| Mills (33)
| Mills (9)
| Dumars (8)
| The Palace of Auburn Hills21,454
| 11–24

|- align="center"
|colspan="9" bgcolor="#bbcaff"|All-Star Break
|- style="background:#cfc;"
|- bgcolor="#bbffbb"
|- align="center" bgcolor="#ffcccc"
| 52
| February 23, 19958:30p.m. EST
| @ Houston
| L 99–110
| Dumars (28)
| Miller (10)
| Dumars (8)
| The Summit16,611
| 19–33

Player statistics

Regular season

Player Statistics Citation:

Awards and records
Grant Hill, NBA Rookie of the Year Award
Grant Hill, NBA All-Rookie Team 1st Team

Transactions

References

See also
1994-95 NBA season

Detroit Pistons seasons
Detroit
Detroit
Detroit